Amy Samir Ghanem (born 31 March 1987) is an Egyptian actress.

Biography
Ghanem was born in Cairo in 1987 into an artistic family, her father was comedian Samir Ghanem (1937–2021), her mother was actress Dalal Abdel Aziz (1960–2021) and her sister is actress Donia Samir Ghanem. Ghanem has a very strong comedic style, similar to that of her parents. Since 2016, she has been married to actor Hassan El Raddad.

Filmography

Cinema 
 Assal Eswed (2010)
 Samir wa Shahir wa Bahir (2010)
 Bolbol Hayran (2010)
 X-Large (2011)
 Cima Ali Baba (2011)
 Banat El am (2012)
 Ghesh Al Zawgeyya (2012)
 Taitah Rahibah (2012)
 Hatuli Ragel (2013)
 Zanqat Sittat (2015)
 Ashan Kharjee (2016)

Television 
 Hekayat Beneeshha (2010)
 Nona El Mazouna (2011)
 Viva Atata (2014)
 Super Henedi (2014)
 Heba regl el ghorab (2014)
 Nelly and Sherihan (2016)
 Fi Al La La Land (2017)
 Azmi & Ashjan (2018)

References

External links

1987 births
Living people
Actresses from Cairo
Egyptian film actresses
Egyptian television actresses
21st-century Egyptian actresses